Cameron Island is one of the uninhabited members of the Queen Elizabeth Islands in the Canadian arctic islands in Nunavut, Canada.

Commercial oil production 
Cameron Island is notable as being the only site which has been developed for commercial oil production in the Canadian Arctic islands. From 1985 to 1996 the double-hulled tanker M.V.Arctic shipped the light crude from Bent Horn in the south-west of the island to Montreal. The initial discovery, in 1974 by Panarctic Oils Ltd, reflected the urgency to find new sources of crude oil after the 1973 oil crisis. The abandonment in 1996 reflects the difficulties of exploiting the resource in this harsh environment, although the current production licence (held by Canada Southern Petroleum Ltd) expired in 2010 and could be extended. After abandonment, final clean-up occurred in 1999.

Cameron Island is a desolate spot: a dark-hued landscape of low hills. Oil exploration and traffic on land were concentrated in the winter months, when "winter roads" of compacted snow across the tundra were used by heavy vehicles. Appropriate efforts were taken to minimise the damage to this fragile environment, but where the vegetation was damaged, increased depths of summer thaw occurred. Possibly the greatest concern was caused by the sumps at the well-sites, into which the toxic drilling muds were pumped. These basins, blasted out of the permafrost, relied on the gradual freeze-back of the ground to seal in the waste materials.

Cameron Island was named in 1952 after Maxwell George Cameron (d.1951), the chief cartographer of the surveys and mapping branch, Department of Mines and Technical Surveys.

See also 
Patterson Rock

References

External links
 Cameron Island in the Atlas of Canada - Toporama; Natural Resources Canada

Islands of the Queen Elizabeth Islands
Uninhabited islands of Qikiqtaaluk Region